Tom Clancy's Ghost Recon: Island Thunder is an expansion pack for Tom Clancy's Ghost Recon, released for Microsoft Windows and Xbox. It is also a playable campaign in Tom Clancy's Ghost Recon: Jungle Storm, a game released for the PlayStation 2 and N-Gage systems.

Plot
In 2010, two years after the events of Tom Clancy's Ghost Recon, and one year after the events of Tom Clancy's Ghost Recon: Desert Siege, Cuba is free, or at least it's supposed to be. Since Fidel Castro's death [in the storyline] in 2006, the island of Cuba is wary of the communist rule it had been under for nearly 50 years. It's time for the first free and open elections since Carlos Prio Socarras, who was overthrown by Batista in the early 1950s. The FDG (El Frente Democratico de la Gente or People's Democratic Front) has fronted a man named Ariel Priego as their candidate. The FDG are an outspoken anti-US political faction that wishes to return Cuba to its long-standing communist dictatorship. Although the FDG publicly denies utilizing violence as a means of coercion, the reality is quite the contrary, as the Ghosts quickly discover. Now it is up to them to set things right again, without making it appear that the United States is getting its hands too dirty, and ensuring the elections proceed smoothly.

The first few missions see the Ghosts conducting operations against arms and drug shipping operations by agents and allies of Priego, the ultimate aim being to prevent any strong-arming of voters on election day. When election day comes, the Ghosts are responsible for protecting a voting center at the town hall in Cienfuegos, a task that proves none too easy as men loyal to Priego assault the building and take hostages elsewhere in the city. Unsurprisingly, Priego loses the election badly. Becoming desperate, he asks for help from his backers in Colombia, and FARC sends in hired soldiers to take Cuba by force. The Ghosts assist in defeating this effort, and FARC soon decides to cut its losses.

Running out of allies, time, and options, Priego flees to an old fortress in a hilled section of Cuba. The Ghosts are ordered to assault the fortress and capture Priego alive. If he is killed, he could be made into a martyr all too easily, something that would be highly detrimental to the new Cuban government. The Ghosts succeed, destroying a helicopter that Priego had intended to use for his escape. Trapped and with his remaining soldiers killed, Priego surrenders.

Gameplay

Character development
Every time a character survives a mission they earn combat points. These points are used to further advance the characters in-game abilities including the strength of their weapons, how successfully they are able to move around enemies without being seen, their endurance (how many hits they can sustain before dying) and their leadership (The stats of a fire team member under a leader with a high leadership rating will be increased).

Reception

Tom Clancy's Ghost Recon: Island Thunder was met with positive reception.  GameRankings and Metacritic gave it a score of 81.59% and 82 out of 100 for the PC version, and 81.65% and 81 out of 100 for the Xbox version.

Combined sales of Island Thunder and Tom Clancy's Ghost Recon: Jungle Storm reached 1.1 million copies by the end of March 2004.

References

External links
 

2002 video games
Multiplayer and single-player video games
Red Storm Entertainment games
Tom Clancy games
Tom Clancy's Ghost Recon games
Ubisoft games
Video game expansion packs
Video games developed in the United States
Video games set in 2010
Video games set in Cuba
Video games set on islands
Windows games
Xbox games
de:Tom Clancy’s Ghost Recon#Island Thunder
es:Tom Clancy's Ghost Recon#Ghost Recon: Island Thunder
gl:Tom Clancy's Ghost Recon#Ghost Recon: Island Thunder